"I'm Waiting for the Man" is a song by American rock band the Velvet Underground. Written by Lou Reed, it was first released on their 1967 debut album, The Velvet Underground & Nico. The lyrics describe a man's efforts to obtain heroin in Harlem.

In various reviews, it is described as "tough garage rock", "proto-punk classic", and "one of the all-time classic rock songs", with renditions by a number of artists.

Recording
Along with "Venus in Furs" and "Heroin", "I'm Waiting for the Man" was recorded in May 1966 at TTG Studios while the band was staying in Hollywood. It has been musically described as garage rock, proto-punk, and hard rock. The lyrics describe a man's efforts to obtain heroin. Despite the song's title, the lyrics refer to "my man" rather than "the man" throughout.

Reception and legacy
In a song review for AllMusic, Dave Thompson called it "one of the all-time classic rock songs... Over chunky guitar, clunking piano, and jackhammer drums, Reed half-sings, half-intones what he would once describe as a love song about a man and the subway." He notes that it has been recorded by numerous artists, including "David Bowie and the Stooges [who] both cut fascinating takes on the song". Each member of the Velvet Underground has performed the song based on their own interpretations.

In 2004 Rolling Stone magazine ranked the song at number 159 on its list of the 500 Greatest Songs of All Time. It was moved to number 161 in 2010, and finally re-ranked at number 81 in 2021. The magazine noted:

In 2012 Consequence of Sound included it in their list of the 100 greatest top songs of all time, ranking it number 65. In lists ranking the greatest songs from the 1960s, NME ranked it number 6, while Pitchfork placed it at number 27. Based on the song's appearances in professional rankings and listings, the aggregate website Acclaimed Music lists "I'm Waiting for the Man" as the 8th most acclaimed song of 1967, the 39th most acclaimed song of the 1960s and the 105th most acclaimed song in history. In 2012, Paste ranked the song number three on their list of the 20 greatest Velvet Underground songs, and in 2021, The Guardian placed the song at number nine on their list of the 30 greatest Velvet Underground songs.

Personnel
Source:
 Lou Reed – vocals, lead guitar
 John Cale –  piano, bass guitar
 Sterling Morrison – rhythm guitar
 Maureen Tucker – drums, tambourine
 Andy Warhol – producer
 Tom Wilson – post-production supervisor

David Bowie
In December 1966, David Bowie's manager, Kenneth Pitt, acquired an acetate of the then-unreleased The Velvet Underground & Nico and presented it to Bowie. Upon hearing "I'm Waiting for the Man", he went to his band at the time, the Buzz, and told them they were going to learn it: "We learned 'Waiting for the Man' right then and there and we were playing it on stage within a week." He later recalled in an 2003 interview with Vanity Fair: "Amusingly, not only was I to cover a Velvets song before anyone else in the world, I actually did it before the album came out. Now that's the essence of Mod."

Bowie first attempted to record "I'm Waiting for the Man" in the studio during the sessions for his 1967 debut album, and later properly recorded it with another band, the Riot Squad, on April 5, 1967. In his book Rebel Rebel, Chris O'Leary notes the subpar quality of the recording, writing that it "sounded as if they were making do with what they'd found in a school music room." This version later appeared on the Riot Squad compilations The Last Chapter: Mods & Sods (2012) and The Toy Soldier EP. In this version, Bowie misinterpreted the song's subject matter, containing the line "I'm just looking for a good friendly behind" instead of "I'm just looking for a dear, dear friend of mine". Tony Visconti later told biographer Nicholas Pegg: "A very young David Bowie didn't yet know that 'the man' in Harlem parlance meant the drug dealer. So he naturally assumed it was a gay encounter involving money."

Bowie performed "I'm Waiting for the Man", often titled as "Waiting for the Man", for BBC radio shows in 1972 (one recording appearing on 2000's Bowie at the Beeb) and frequently on the Ziggy Stardust Tour (one recording appearing on 1994's Santa Monica '72). He would further perform it on the 1976 Isolar Tour and the 1990 Sound+Vision Tour. While his 1967 recording followed Reed's original chord structure, Bowie made subtle changes to his live performances. He performed the song with Reed at his 50th birthday bash in 1997. David Buckley writes that Bowie's 1977 song "Heroes" was influenced by Reed's writing.

Footnotes

References

Sources
 

 

1967 songs
American garage rock songs
American hard rock songs
The Velvet Underground songs
Songs written by Lou Reed
Songs about heroin
Songs about New York City
David Bowie songs
The Stooges songs